Barai is a Koiarian language spoken in Oro Province of Papua New Guinea.

Locations
The Birarie dialect is spoken in Itokama, Madokoro, Naokanane, and Umuate villages in Ufia ward, Afore Rural LLG. Other Barai dialects are also spoken in Rigo Inland Rural LLG.

Alphabet 
The Barai language has 19 letters (Aa, Bb, Cc, Dd, Ee, Ff, Gg, Hh, Ii, Kk, Mm, Nn, Oo, Rr, Ss, Zz, Tt, Uu, Vv) and one diphthong (Ae ae).

Sample text

References

External links 
 Alphabet and pronunciation

Languages of Papua New Guinea
Koiarian languages